Salpingotus is a genus of rodent in the family Dipodidae. It contains the following species:
 Genus Salpingotus
Subgenus Anguistodontus
 Thick-tailed pygmy jerboa (Salpingotus crassicauda)
Subgenus Prosalpingotus
 Heptner's pygmy jerboa (Salpingotus heptneri)
 Pale pygmy jerboa (Salpingotus pallidus)
 Thomas's pygmy jerboa (Salpingotus thomasi)
Subgenus Salpingotus
 Kozlov's pygmy jerboa (Salpingotus kozlovi)

References

 
Rodent genera
Taxonomy articles created by Polbot